Chasms Accord is the second and final studio album by experimental ensemble Rhythm & Noise, released in 1985 through Ralph Records.

Release and reception 

Ted Mill of Allmusic noted that Chasms Accord is mellower than the previous record, saying that this "keyboard-heavy album throbs darkly, but rarely jumps out at you, content instead to muse upon murky, half-completed ideas." Ira Robbins of the Trouser Press described Chasms Accord as being "high on drama and low on intentional ugliness, making it a vivid and apropos match for the stress of modern life" and that it "could serve as the soundtrack to any number of offbeat films."

In 1996, Asphodel Records re-issued the album on CD as a compilation. In addition to various tracks from Chasms Accord, it contains early unreleased compositions and four tracks from Contents Under Notice.

Track listing

Personnel 
Adapted from the Chasms Accord liner notes.

Rhythm & Noise
Naut Humon – sampler, vocals, illustrations
Rex Probe – guitar
Desmond Shea – percussion, keyboards, engineering
Z'EV – sampler, drum machine

Additional musicians
Alaric – Moog synthesizer, castanets, keyboards, drums, engineering
Michael Belfer – guitar (A6)
Diamanda Galás – vocals
Paul Hagain – backing vocals, slit drum
Production and additional personnel
Roger Bayless – illustrations, art direction
Frank Harris – production
Polyploid Sam – photography

Release history

External links

References 

1985 albums
Ralph Records albums
Rhythm & Noise albums